Mosher is an unincorporated community in Mellette County, in the U.S. state of South Dakota.

History
Mosher had its start in 1930 when the railroad was extended to that point. The community has the name of Harmon B. Mosher, a railroad official. A post office was established at Mosher in 1930, and remained in operation until 1974.

References

Unincorporated communities in Mellette County, South Dakota
Unincorporated communities in South Dakota